Samuel Franklin Miller (May 27, 1827 – March 16, 1892) was a United States representative from New York during the latter half of the American Civil War.

Miller was born in Franklin, Delaware County, New York on May 27, 1827. He graduated from the Delaware Literary Institute, then studied law at Hamilton College, Clinton, New York, from which he graduated in 1852. Miller was admitted to the bar in 1853, but instead of practicing law instead engaged in farming and lumbering.

Miller was elected as a member of the New York State Assembly for Delaware County (1st District) in 1854. He served as a colonel in the State militia and was elected as a Republican to the 38th United States Congress from March 4, 1863, to March 3, 1865. He was a member of the State constitutional convention in 1867, district collector of internal revenue from 1869 to 1873, and a member of the State board of charities from 1869 to 1877. He was elected to the 44th United States Congress from March 4, 1875, to March 3, 1877.

After leaving politics, Miller lived at his farm in North Franklin, where he engaged in agricultural pursuits and lumbering. He died in Franklin on March 16, 1892, and was interred there, in Ouleout Valley Cemetery.

References

Republican Party members of the New York State Assembly
Hamilton College (New York) alumni
People of New York (state) in the American Civil War
1827 births
1892 deaths
Republican Party members of the United States House of Representatives from New York (state)
19th-century American politicians